The 2001 Men's European Volleyball Championship was the 22nd edition of the event, organized by Europe's governing volleyball body, the Confédération Européenne de Volleyball. It was hosted in Ostrava, Czech Republic from September 8 to September 16, 2001.

Qualification

The number one to six from the 1999 edition of the Men's European Volleyball Championship — Italy, Yugoslavia, Russia, France, Czech Republic (also host) and the Netherlands — were automatically qualified for the 2001 edition. The other teams had to qualify in the previous year.

Teams

Group A
 

 
 
 

Group B

Squads

Preliminary round

Group A

September 8

September 9

September 10

September 12

September 13

Group B

September 8

September 9

September 10

September 12

September 13

Final round

September 15

September 16

September 15

September 16

Final ranking

Individual awards

Most Valuable Player

Best Scorer
 
Best Attacker
 
Best Blocker
  

Best Digger
 
Best Setter
 
Best Libero
 
Best Receiver

References
 CEV Results
 Czech Results

Men's European Volleyball Championships
E
Volleyball Championship
V
September 2001 sports events in Europe